The 2013 United Kingdom local elections took place on Thursday 2 May 2013. Elections were held in 35 English councils: all 27 non-metropolitan county councils and eight unitary authorities, and in one Welsh unitary authority. Direct mayoral elections took place in Doncaster and North Tyneside. These elections last took place on the 4 June 2009 at the same time as the 2009 European Parliament Elections, except for County Durham, Northumberland and the Anglesey where elections last took place in 2008.

The BBC's projected national vote share (PNV) put Labour on 29%, the Conservatives on 25%, UKIP on 23% and the Liberal Democrats on 14%. Elections analysts Rallings and Thrasher estimated 29% for Labour, 26% for the Conservatives, 22% for UKIP and 13% for the Liberal Democrats.

On the same day a parliamentary by-election took place in the North East constituency of South Shields following the departure of David Miliband, with the Labour Party retaining the seat.

Criteria to vote
All registered electors (British, Irish, Commonwealth and European Union citizens) aged 18 or over were entitled to vote in the local elections. Those temporarily away from their ordinary address (for example, away working, on holiday, in student accommodation or in hospital) were also entitled to vote in the local elections, as were those who had moved abroad and registered as overseas electors.

Record choice
The UK Independence Party and the Green Party stood record numbers of candidates.

Results

Labour and UKIP made substantial gains, but the Conservatives won the most councillors and retained control of most councils. The BBC published projected national vote shares, adjusting for which regions are holding local elections and extrapolating to the national situation. These were Labour 29%, Conservatives 25%, UKIP 23% and the Liberal Democrats 14%. This is the lowest figure for the Conservatives since 1982 and the lowest ever figure for the Liberal Democrats. It is also the first time that none of the three main parties in the Commons has scored 30% or more. Rallings & Thrasher separately calculated a projected national vote share of Labour 29%, Conservatives 26%, UKIP 22% and the Liberal Democrats 13%.

The actual votes received were Conservative 34.3%, Labour 21.1%, UKIP 19.9%, Lib Dem 13.8% and Green 3.5%.

Overall, in England, the Conservatives saw 1116 councillors elected (down 335), Labour 538 (up 291), the Liberal Democrats 352 (down 124), independents 165 (up 24), UKIP 147 (up 139), the Greens 22 (up 5), Residents Associations 12 (up 2), Mebyon Kernow 4 (up 1), the Liberal Party 3 (up 1) and Independent Community and Health Concern 2 (no change). The BNP won no seats (down 3).

England

Non-metropolitan county councils

All 27 county councils for areas with a two-tier structure of local governance had all of their seats up for election. These were first-past-the-post elections in a mixture of single-member and multi-member electoral divisions.

†The Conservatives won control of the council in the 2009 elections but lost their majority during its term.

Unitary authorities
Eight single-tier unitary authorities held elections. Seven of these had all of their seats up for election, whilst one, Bristol, elected a third of its seats. These are first-past-the-post elections in a mixture of single-member and multi-member wards.

Mayoral elections
Two elections for directly elected mayors were held, who act as council leader. These are elected using the Supplementary Vote system.  Hartlepool's referendum in November 2012 resulted in the post being abolished from May 2013.

Wales

In Wales, a single council, the Isle of Anglesey, was up for election. This election was postponed in 2012, when all other Welsh councils were elected, in order to allow an electoral review to take place for the council.

Elections not scheduled to be held in 2013 (other than by-elections)
The 32 London borough councils (next election 2014)
The 36 metropolitan district councils (next election 2014)
The 201 district councils in two-tier authorities (next election 2014 in the 67 councils where members are elected by thirds, and 2015 in the 127 councils where all members are elected together)
48 unitary authorities of England (next election 2014 in the 19 councils where members are elected by thirds, excluding Bristol, and 2015 in the 30 councils where all members are elected together)
The Scottish local councils
Local councils in Northern Ireland
The Welsh local councils (except Anglesey)

See also
2013 City of London Corporation election
Political make-up of local councils in the United Kingdom
2013 South Shields by-election
2012 United Kingdom local elections
2009 United Kingdom local elections (the last time most of these elections were held)

Notes

References